Sideris Tasiadis (born 7 May 1990) is a German slalom canoeist of Greek descent who has competed at the international level since 2005.Son of greeks him lived in Thrace, Greece at the village Komara for 10 years during his childhood.

Career
In 2012, he won a silver medal in the men's C1 at the 2012 Summer Olympics in London behind Tony Estanguet (FRA) and beating two-time Olympic champion Michal Martikán (SVK). He finished fifth in the C1 event four years later at the 2016 Summer Olympics in Rio de Janeiro. Tasiadis earned a second Olympic medal in the C1 event by finishing third at the 2020 Summer Olympics.

He also won six medals at the ICF Canoe Slalom World Championships with one gold (C1: 2022), four silvers (C1 team: 2010, 2011, 2013, 2015) and a bronze (C1: 2018). Tasiadis won 12 medals at the European Championships (3 golds, 6 silvers and 3 bronzes).

Tasiadis won the overall World Cup title in the C1 class in 2013 and 2017. He is currently the No. 1-ranked athlete by the ICF, having held that position since 2018.

World Cup individual podiums

Personal life
Tasiadis dated slalom canoeist Claudia Bär until her death in 2015 after a two-year battle with leukemia.

References

2010 ICF Canoe Slalom World Championships 12 September 2010 C1 men's team final results – accessed 12 September 2010.

External links

German male canoeists
Living people
1990 births
Canoeists at the 2012 Summer Olympics
Canoeists at the 2016 Summer Olympics
Canoeists at the 2020 Summer Olympics
German people of Greek descent
Olympic canoeists of Germany
Olympic bronze medalists for Germany
Olympic silver medalists for Germany
Olympic medalists in canoeing
Medalists at the 2012 Summer Olympics
Medalists at the 2020 Summer Olympics
Medalists at the ICF Canoe Slalom World Championships
Sportspeople from Augsburg